Nordland Township is the name of the following places in the U.S. state of Minnesota:

Nordland Township, Aitkin County, Minnesota
Nordland Township, Lyon County, Minnesota

Minnesota township disambiguation pages